The College of Letters and Science (L&S) is the largest of the 14 colleges at the University of California, Berkeley and encompasses the liberal arts. The college was established in its present state in 1915 with the merger of the College of Letters, the College of Social Science, and the College of Natural Science. As of the 2022-23 academic year, there were about 23,601 undergraduates and 2,417 graduate students enrolled in the college. The College of Letters and Science awards only Bachelor of Arts degrees at the undergraduate level, in contrast to the other schools and colleges of UC Berkeley which award only Bachelor of Science degrees at the undergraduate level.

Faculty and students 
L&S is organized into five divisions: Arts and Humanities, Biological Sciences, Mathematical and Physical Sciences, Social Sciences, and the Undergraduate Division. Of the graduate divisions, Social Sciences is the most popular, followed by Mathematical and Physical Sciences, Arts and Humanities, and Biological Science. The Undergraduate Division serves the 23,000 undergraduate students in L&S. Each division has its own administration, including a dean, associate dean, and assistant deans. Jennifer Johnson-Hanks serves as the College's executive dean. L&S has about 750 faculty members, including 13 Nobel laureates, 3 Pulitzer Prize winners, and 12 MacArthur Fellows.

The majority of undergraduates at the University are enrolled in the College of Letters & Science. Although freshman applicants indicate an area of interest on their applications, all freshmen in L&S enter as undeclared majors. This contrasts with other undergraduate colleges at UC Berkeley, such as the College of Engineering, where applicants indicate their major on the application and enter as declared majors. L&S undergraduates must declare a major before they begin their junior year. "Capped majors" (e.g. Economics, Public Health, Psychology) are impacted and have more stringent declaration policies. All undergraduates in L&S must complete classes in reading & composition, quantitative reasoning, foreign language, and a seven-course breadth requirement.

L&S offers a wide variety of graduate programs, including master's and doctorate programs. Many of these programs are ranked within the top five in their field by U.S. News & World Report. Two programs, Jewish Studies and Near Eastern Religions, are joint programs with the Graduate Theological Union in Berkeley. One program, Medical Anthropology, is a joint program with UCSF. The L&S graduate division serves 87 master's/first professional students and 2,676 doctoral students as of Fall 2013.

Departments

Arts & Humanities 

Art History
Art Practice
Classics
Comparative Literature
East Asian Languages and Cultures
English
Film and Media Studies
French
German
Italian Studies
Music
Near Eastern Studies
Philosophy
Rhetoric
Scandinavian
Slavic Languages and Literatures
South and Southeast Asian Studies
Spanish and Portuguese
Theater, Dance, and Performance Studies

Biological Science 
Integrative Biology
Molecular and Cell Biology
 Biochemistry, Biophysics, and Structural Biology
 Cell and Developmental Biology
 Genetics, Genomics, and Development
 Immunology and Pathogenesis
 Neurobiology
Physical Education Program

Mathematical & Physical Sciences 
Astrophysics
Earth and Planetary Science
Mathematics
 Applied Mathematics
Physics
Statistics

Social Sciences 

African American Studies
Anthropology
Demography
Economics
Ethnic Studies
Gender and Women's Studies
Geography
History
Linguistics
Political Science (Charles and Louise Travers Department of Political Science)
Psychology
Sociology

Additional majors administered by the Division of Undergraduate Studies 

 American Studies
 Asian Studies
 Cognitive Science
 Creative Writing
 Data Science (program managed by the Division of Computing, Data Science, & Society)
 Development Studies
 Disability Studies
 Interdisciplinary Studies
 Latin American Studies
 Media Studies
 Religious Studies
 Middle Eastern Studies
 Peace and Conflict Studies
 Political Economy

Additional majors administered by other colleges 
 Chemistry (B.A.) (College of Chemistry)
 Computer Science (B.A.) (College of Engineering)
 Environmental Economics and Policy (College of Natural Resources)
 Legal Studies (School of Law)
 Operations Research and Management Science (College of Engineering)
 Public Health (School of Public Health)
 Social Welfare (School of Social Welfare)

References

External links

1915 establishments in California
Educational institutions established in 1915
Liberal arts colleges at universities in the United States
Science and technology in California
Letters and Science, College of